Mary Walsh: Open Book was a weekly book club series on CBC Television, which aired from 2002 to 2005. Similar to Oprah's Book Club, the series was hosted by actress and comedian Mary Walsh, who moderated a discussion about books and literature with a panel of celebrities and other guests. Each episode of the series was structured around discussion of a single book, including both Canadian and international literature, and both fiction and non-fiction titles. The series aired at 11 p.m. on Sunday nights, attracting relatively strong ratings for a late time slot.

Participants included actors Megan Follows, Greg Malone, Paul Gross and Mark McKinney, political scientist Janice Stein, lawyer and politician Jerome Kennedy, writers Susan Musgrave and Evelyn Lau, singer Jann Arden, journalist Pamela Wallin and columnist Jan Wong.

Michael Donovan was the creator of Open Book.

Episodes

Season 1

Season 2

Season 3

Impact
The show was spoofed on Royal Canadian Air Farce as Open Book with Marg the Princess Warrior, with Roger Abbott impersonating Walsh in her Marg Delahunty persona from This Hour Has 22 Minutes, discussing books with her guests (including Luba Goy's Margaret Atwood). The running gag was Marg's tendency to rant incessantly about each book and then stray off-topic into her political views and declaring her opinion supreme, eventually driving away her guests.

References

External links

CBC Television original programming
2002 Canadian television series debuts
2005 Canadian television series endings
2000s Canadian television talk shows
Canadian late-night television programming
Television shows about books and literature